Humboldt Township is one of twelve townships in Coles County, Illinois, United States.  As of the 2010 census, its population was 1,341 and it contained 551 housing units. The township changed its name from Milton Township on May 7, 1860.

Geography

Cities, towns, villages
 Humboldt

Extinct towns
 Dorans

Cemeteries
The township contains four cemeteries: East Humboldt, Gardner, Humboldt and Township.

Major highways
  Interstate 57
  US Route 45

Demographics

School districts
 Arcola Consolidated Unit School District 306
 Mattoon Community Unit School District 2

Political districts
 Illinois's 15th congressional district
 State House District 110
 State Senate District 55

References
 
 United States Census Bureau 2007 TIGER/Line Shapefiles
 United States National Atlas

External links
 City-Data.com
 Illinois State Archives

Adjacent townships 

Townships in Coles County, Illinois
Townships in Illinois